Joanna Żółkowska (born 6 March 1950 in Warsaw) is a Polish actress.

Filmography
 Siedemset siedemdziesiąt siedem, 1972
 Szklana kula, 1972
 Illuminacja (Illumination), 1972
 Obszar zamknięty, 1973
 Strach, 1975
 Smuga cienia (The Shadow Line), 1976
 Barwy ochronne (Camouflage), 1977
 Lalka (series), 1978
 Najdłuższa wojna nowoczesnej Europy (series), 1979-1981
 Prom do Szwecji, 1979
 Golem, 1979
 07 zgłoś się (season 3 episode 1: Grobowiec rodziny von Rausch), 1981
 W wannie, 1981
 Wojna światów - Następne stulecie, 1981
 Papkin - sztuka aktorska, 1982
 Popielec, 1982
 Cesarskie cięcie (Caesarean Section), 1987
 Wielkie oczy, 1987
 Kawalerki, 1989
 Sceny nocne, 1989
 Janka, 1989
 Superwizja, 1990
 Rozmowy kontrolowane (Controlled Conversations), 1991
 Balanga, 1993
 Spółka rodzinna (series), 1994
 Młode wilki, 1995
 Kamień na kamieniu, 1995
 Dom, 1995
 Matka swojej matki, 1996
 Ja, Malinowski, 1999
 Na koniec świata, 1999
 Dom (2 episodes, season 5 episode 2: Miłość to tylko obietnica and season 5 episode 3: Kolejka do życia), 2000
 Temida jest kobietą, czyli historie zapożyczone od Guy de Maupassanta, 2000
 Klan (series), 1997-
 Zróbmy sobie wnuka, 2003
 Długi weekend, 2004

Screenplays
 Matka swojej matki, 1996
 Na koniec świata, 1999

Relationships

She has a sister and a daughter who are both actresses. Her former husband was a director and actor. She is married to Robert Gliński, a director and scenarist.

External links

References

 

20th-century Polish actresses
1950 births
Living people
Actresses from Warsaw
Recipients of the Silver Medal for Merit to Culture – Gloria Artis
21st-century Polish actresses
Polish television actresses